Amadou Kassaraté (born 14 January 1996) is a semi-professional footballer who plays as a midfielder for Welling United.

Career
Born in London, England, Kassaraté attended Thomas Tallis Secondary School. After starting his career with Welling United, Kassarate joined Walton Casuals in February 2015. However, he failed to make an appearance for the Isthmian Division One South club and left at the end of the season.

In December 2015, he joined Scottish Championship side Dumbarton's under-20 side. After impressing for them he signed a first team deal in July 2016 alongside fellow under-20s player Ryan Clark having made his debut as a trialist in a pre-season friendly with Dundee He made his senior debut for the club as a substitute in a 6–2 defeat to Dundee.

He joined Junior side Kirkintilloch Rob Roy on loan in September 2016. On 3 February 2017, Kassaraté moved on loan to Scottish League One side Stranraer, joining up with former Dumbarton assistant manager and current Stranraer boss, Stephen Farrell. He scored his first senior goal with a spectacular bicycle kick against Stenhousemuir in April 2017

On 5 October 2018, Kassaraté joined Greek side Thesprotos. On his second appearance for his new club on 4 November 2018, he scored his first goal, a header in a 3–0 win over Souli Paramythia. He was part of the side who secured promotion to the Greek Football League after winning 3–0 on aggregate in the Gamma Ethniki promotion playoffs.

In November 2019, Kassaraté rejoined Isthmian League Premier Division side Cheshunt. He went on to make 16 appearances in all competitions, scoring three times. In May 2022, he scored in the play-off final to help Cheshunt secure promotion to National League South.

International career
Kassaraté is eligible to play for England, through his birth country and Senegal, through his parents. In April 2015, Kassaraté was called up by Manager Joseph Koto to play for Senegal under-20s. Kassaraté was expected to be included in the Senegal squad for the FIFA U-20 World Cup, but a foot injury, however, prevented him from joining the squad.

Personal life
Kassaraté is a former student of University of East London where he graduated with a degree in sport and exercise science. He is the founder of urban streetwear clothing brand Sapécomejamais.

Career statistics

Club

Honours
Thesprotos
Gamma Ethniki play-off winner: 2018-19

Cheshunt
Isthmian League Premier Division play-off winner: 2021–22

References

External links

1996 births
Living people
Welling United F.C. players
Walton Casuals F.C. players
Dumbarton F.C. players
Kirkintilloch Rob Roy F.C. players
Stranraer F.C. players
Senegalese footballers
Association football midfielders
Scottish Professional Football League players
Expatriate footballers in Scotland
Expatriate footballers in Greece
Gamma Ethniki players
English expatriate footballers
Thesprotos F.C. players
Cheshunt F.C. players
Isthmian League players
National League (English football) players
Senegal youth international footballers
English footballers
Footballers from Greater London
English expatriate sportspeople in Greece